Margrethe Frederikke Sophie Løvenskiold (16 January 1785 – 2 June 1876) was a Danish composer.

See also
List of Danish composers

References
This article was initially translated from the Danish Wikipedia.

1785 births
1876 deaths
Danish women composers
19th-century Danish composers
19th-century women composers